Malin Elisabeth Andersson (born 4 May 1973 in Kristianstad, Skåne) is a Swedish women's football player.

In an international career lasting from 1994 to 2005, Andersson appeared in 151 international matches for Sweden. At the time of her retirement, Kristin Bengtsson was the only other player in Swedish football history to have amassed 150 caps. She competed in the 1995, 1999, and 2003 Women's World Cups, netting three goals for Sweden overall. She also competed for Sweden in the 1996, 2000 and 2004 Olympics.

Domestically, she played for Malmö FF in the Damallsvenskan, and won the Diamantbollen as Sweden's top female footballer in 1995.

Appearances and goals in World Cup & Olympic tournaments
Malin Andersson competed in three FIFA Women's World Cups:
Sweden 1995,
USA 1999, USA 2003. She also played in three Olympic tournaments: the 1996 Atlanta Games, the 2000 Sydney Games, and the 2004 Athens Games.

She appeared in all but two of her team's matches across those tournaments, and played every minute for Sweden at the 1995 and 1999 World Cups and at the 2000 Olympics. In the 1995 World Cup, she scored both the first and the final goals for Sweden as they came back from an 0–2 deficit vs Germany to win 3–2 on the second day of match play. Her 53' goal against Brazil in the Quarter-Finals of the 2003 World Cup proved to be the winning goal in that match, a crucial victory in Sweden's march to a second-place finish.

Appearances and goals in European Championship tournaments
Malin Andersson appeared in four editions of the European Championship: 1995 (various locations), Norway/Sweden 1997, Germany 2001, and England 2005. Her squad finished second in the 1995 and 2001 tournaments.

Honours

Individual

 Diamantbollen: 1995

Domestic

Älvsjö AIK
Damallsvenskan: Winner 1995, 1996, 1997, 1998, 1999
Svenska Cupen: Winner 1996, 1999

International
Sweden

1995 FIFA Women's World Cup: Quarter-final
1999 FIFA Women's World Cup: Quarter-final
2003 FIFA Women's World Cup: Runner-up  
1996 Summer Olympics in Atlanta: Group stage
2000 Summer Olympics in Sydney:  Group stage
2004 Summer Olympics in Athens:   Fourth place
UEFA Women's Euro 1995: Runner-up
UEFA Women's Euro 1997: Semi-finals
UEFA Women's Euro 2001: Runner-up
UEFA Women's Euro 2005: Semi-finals
Algarve Cup (Participated from 1995 to 2005): Winner 1995, 2001
Four Nations Tournament: Fourth Place 1998, Third Place 2004
Australia Cup: Winner 2003

References

Match reports

External links
 
 International statistics

1973 births
Living people
Swedish women's footballers
Olympic footballers of Sweden
Footballers at the 1996 Summer Olympics
Footballers at the 2000 Summer Olympics
Footballers at the 2004 Summer Olympics
Sweden women's international footballers
1995 FIFA Women's World Cup players
FIFA Century Club
Kristianstads DFF players
Damallsvenskan players
People from Kristianstad Municipality
Women's association football midfielders
2003 FIFA Women's World Cup players
1999 FIFA Women's World Cup players
Sportspeople from Skåne County